Karen Macdonald Gillon ( Turnbull; born 18 August 1967) is a Scottish Labour Party politician who served as Member of the Scottish Parliament (MSP) for the constituency of Clydesdale from 1999 to 2011.

Early life and career 
Gillon was born in 1967 in Edinburgh to Edith Turnbull. She was educated at the state comprehensive Jedburgh Grammar School before going on to study at the University of Birmingham. Before entering politics, she worked in community education. From 1997 until 1999, she served as personal assistant to Helen Liddell MP.

Political career 
Gillon was elected in the 1999 Scottish Parliament election, taking 16,755 votes (43.02%). She was re elected in 2003 with 14,800 votes (46.62%) and in 2007 with 13,835 votes (41.5%). She served as Labour's spokesperson on rural development until her defeat in 2011.

Gillon was co-chair of the Cross Party Group on Malawi and worked with civic society across Scotland and in the constituency of Clydesdale, to develop better links between the two countries. She was defeated in the 2011 Scottish Parliament election by the candidate from the SNP, Aileen Campbell, by 4,216 votes (14.1%).

Personal life 
Gillon is married to James Gillon with whom she has two sons and one daughter. Gillon is a Christian and has described the Beatitudes as the best example in the Bible of turning prayer into action.

References

External links 
 

1967 births
Living people
Labour MSPs
Female members of the Scottish Parliament
People from Jedburgh
Members of the Scottish Parliament 1999–2003
Members of the Scottish Parliament 2003–2007
Members of the Scottish Parliament 2007–2011
Alumni of the University of Birmingham
20th-century Scottish women politicians
Scottish Christians